The Wahiawa Botanical Garden,  is a botanical garden on a high plateau in central Oahu, Hawaii, United States, located between the Wai'anae and Ko'olau mountain ranges. It is one of the Honolulu Botanical Gardens, and home to a collection of tropical flora requiring a relatively cool environment, with emphasis on native Hawaiian plants.  It is nicknamed the "tropical jewel" of the Botanical Gardens. The Garden's site began in the 1920s, when the Hawaiian Sugar Planters' Association leased land from the State of Hawaii for experimental tree planting. Most of the Garden's large trees date from that era. The property was transferred to Honolulu in 1950, and opened as a botanical garden in 1957. It is open seven days a week, from 9am to 4 pm.

Plant collections
The Garden's collections include: Blue Ginger (Dichorisandra thyrsiflora), Jade Vine (Strongylodon macrobotrys)), Hāpuu ii (Cibotium chamissoi), Koa (Acacia koa), Blue Jacaranda (Jacaranda mimosifolia), Nageia nagi, Angiopteris evecta, Shaving Brush Tree (Pseudobombax ellipticum), Autograph Tree (Clusia rosea), Nutmeg (Myristica fragrans), Allspice (Pimenta dioica), Travellers' Palm (Ravenala madagascariensis), Chrysophyllum oliviforme, Common Screwpine (Pandanus utilis), Parkia javanica, Guanacaste (Enterolobium cyclocarpum), Candle Tree (Parmentiera cereifera), Elephant Apple (Dillenia indica), Moreton Bay Fig (Ficus macrophylla), Queensland Kauri (Agathis robusta), Brownea macrophylla, Chicle (Manilkara zapota), Camphor Tree (Cinnamomum camphora), Mexican Cedar (Cedrela odorata), Bamboo (Bambusa vulgaris), Rainbow Eucalyptus (Eucalyptus deglupta), Ochrosia elliptica, Iei.e. (Freycinetia arborea), and Māmaki (Pipturus albidus).

See also
Folklore in Hawaii
 List of botanical gardens in the United States

References 
 Honolulu Botanical Gardens (brochure), Department of Parks and Recreation, City and County of Honolulu, Revision 1/05.

External links 
 Wahiawa Botanical Garden

Honolulu Botanical Gardens
Protected areas of Oahu
Protected areas established in 1957
1957 establishments in Hawaii